Ekspress-AMU3 (meaning Express-AMU3) is a Russian domestic communications satellite. It belongs to the Russian Satellite Communications Company (RSCC) based in Moscow, Russia. To provide of communications services (digital television, telephony, videoconferencing, data transmission, the Internet access, presidential and governmental mobile communications) and to deploy satellite networks by applying VSAT technology to Russia. Replacement for Ekspress-AM3.

Satellite description 
The satellite has 7 C-band transponders and 2 L-band transponders, while the architecture for the Ku-band is reconfigurable allowing either 8 or 22 active transponders. The Ekspress-AMU3 Russian domestic communications satellite, built by Information Satellite Systems Reshetnev (ISS Reshetnev) for Kosmicheskaya Svyaz. The communications payload was built by the French company Thales Alenia Space, in Italy.

Launch 
Ekspress-AMU3 was launched on a Proton-M / Briz-M launch vehicle on 13 December 2021, at 12:07 UTC, from Site 200/39 at Baikonur Cosmodrome, Kazakhstan.

Mission 
Ekspress-AMU3 was launched with Ekspress-AMU7.

See also 

 Ekspress-AMU7

References 

Ekspress satellites
Spacecraft launched in 2021
2021 in Russia
Satellites using the Ekspress bus